His Majesty's hired armed  lugger Venus, which was renamed Agnes in 1804, served the British Royal Navy from 8 March 1804 until she foundered in the Texel in March 1806. 

She was of 66 tons (bm), and her armament consisted of six 12-pounder carronades. She had a crew of 23 men. She served on a contract from 26 April March 1804 to 25 October 1806, during which time the Admiralty paid £2017 12s per year for her hire. 

Around early March 1806 Agnes sent into Yarmouth Amelia Sophia, Kahler, master, which had been sailing from Amsterdam to Bordeaux.

Agnes was under the command of Lieutenant William Morgan when she foundered off the Texel. The date of her loss may be 4 March 1806, or 28 March 1806. The fate of her 30-man crew is unknown.

Notes

Citations

References

 
 
 

Hired armed vessels of the Royal Navy
Maritime incidents in 1806
Shipwrecks of the Netherlands
Shipwrecks in the North Sea